Potassium hypomanganate is the inorganic compound with the formula . Also known as potassium manganate(V), this bright blue solid is a rare example of a salt with the hypomanganate or manganate(V) anion, where the manganese atom is in the +5 oxidation state.

Preparative routes
by two-electron reduction of potassium permanganate with excess potassium sulfite;

by the single-electron reduction of potassium manganate with hydrogen peroxide in 10 M potassium hydroxide solution;

by the single-electron reduction of potassium manganate with mandelate in 3–10 M potassium hydroxide solution;

by disproportionation when manganese dioxide is dissolved in a concentrated solution of potassium hydroxide;

The compound is unstable due to the tendency of the hypomanganate anion to disproportionate in all but the most alkaline solutions.

References

Potassium compounds
Manganese(V) compounds